Autostrada Sistiana–Rabuiese is a motorway without toll, managed by ANAS. The highway does not have a definitive numbering and is therefore devoid of an alphanumeric abbreviation of the type "Ax" or "Axx".

References 

RA12
Transport in Abruzzo